Harpalus rubripes is a ground beetle in the subfamily Harpalinae that is present in much of Europe, Siberia, Central Asia and Anatolia.

References

External links

rubripes
Beetles of Europe
Beetles of Asia
Beetles described in 1812